Reyneh  (also Romanized as Rīneh and Rineh; also known as Rehneh and Reneh) is a city in and the capital of Larijan District, in Amol County, Mazandaran Province, Iran.  At the 2006 census, its population was 860, in 259 families. Reyneh is the closest city to Mount Damavand. The city of Rineh was called Verne in ancient times. Reyneh Hut is the first mountaineering resort made for Hiking Damavand Iran, It is located in Reyneh Town in Larijan district.

References

Populated places in Amol County
Cities in Mazandaran Province
Settled areas of Elburz